Rugless is an unincorporated community in  Lewis County, Kentucky, United States. The Rugless post office  is closed.

Rugless is a corruption of either Ruglas or Ruggles, the surname of an early settler.

References

Unincorporated communities in Lewis County, Kentucky
Unincorporated communities in Kentucky